PeriShip is a logistics provider for the perishable food industry. It was founded in 2001, and is based in Branford, Connecticut. The company exclusively uses FedEx for transportation.

Services
PeriShip may interact with all of the stakeholders in a shipping transaction, which include a shipper of perishable goods, a recipient of perishable goods, and an agency responsible for delivering the perishable goods to the recipient. Its purpose in this interaction is to decrease the time each party must spend on a transaction, which increases business productivity and decreases cost of the shipper and the transportation agency.

On the pre-transaction side, PeriShip places emphasis on proper packaging techniques to ensure integrity of perishable shipments. It also offers web services to both commercial and open-source shopping cart vendors which allows shippers to quote a PeriShip shipping rate to a customer before they buy.

During shipment, PeriShip processes data from FedEx and interprets this data in the form of customized communication, such as regular emails, on the status of the package. It also monitors weather and flight conditions and reports on adverse conditions to the shipper.

References

Logistics companies of the United States
Transport companies established in 2001
Companies based in New Haven County, Connecticut
Transportation companies based in Connecticut